Jack Fairweather (born in 1978), is a British journalist and author.

Early life

Fairweather was born in Shrewsbury, England in 1978. His sister, Chloé Fairweather, directed Dying to Divorce, a film selected as the British entry for the Best International Feature Film at the 94th Academy Awards in 2021. He was educated at Atlantic College, and at Lincoln College at the University of Oxford.

Career

Fairweather was a freelance correspondent embedded with British troops during the 2003 invasion of Iraq. He was a stringer for The Daily Telegraph in Baghdad, where he met his wife Christina Asquith, a journalist working on contract to cover education issues in Iraq for New York Times. Fairweather claims he survived an attempted kidnapping and an attempted suicide bombing in Iraq.

He later contributed freelance articles from Afghanistan to the PostGlobal blog hosted by The Washington Post. His war coverage has won a British Press Award and an Overseas Press Club award citation. His book The Volunteer, a biography about Witold Pilecki, a Polish resistance fighter who infiltrated Auschwitz during the Holocaust and Second World War, won the 2019 Costa Book Award.

Books
 A War of Choice: the British in Iraq 2003-9 (Vintage, 2012)
 The Good War: Why We Couldn’t Win the War or the Peace in Afghanistan, by Jack Fairweather, (Basic Books, 2014)
 The Volunteer: One Man's Mission to Lead an Underground Army Inside Auschwitz and Stop the Holocaust (Custom House, 2019)

Awards

The Good War was a finalist for the 2015 Lionel Gelber Prize.

The Volunteer won the Costa Book of the Year Award 2019.

References

1978 births
Living people
Alumni of the University of Oxford
British male journalists
British war correspondents
Writers from Shrewsbury
People educated at Atlantic College
People educated at a United World College